Red turban may refer to:

Pomaulax gibberosus, a species of sea snail
Red Turban Rebellion (1351–1368), a massive rebellion in China against the Mongol Yuan dynasty, later also spread into Korea
Red Turban Rebellion (1854–1856), a short-lived rebellion in South China against the Manchu Qing dynasty

See also
Portrait of a Man (Self Portrait?), also known as the Portrait of a Man in a Red Turban, a 1433 oil painting by Jan van Eyck